Haloceras carinatum is a species of sea snail, a marine gastropod mollusk in the family Haloceratidae.

Description

Distribution
This species occurs in European waters.

References

 WAREN, A. & P. BOUCHET, 1991 Mollusca Gastropoda : Systematic position and revision of Haloceras, Dall 1889 (Caenogastropoda, Haloceratidae fam. nov.). In : A. CROSNIER & P. BOUCHET (eds), Résultats des Campagnes MUSORSTOM, vol. 7. Mém. Mus. natn. Hist. nat., sér. A, 150 : 111–161
 Gofas S. (2018). A non-planktotrophic haloceratid (Gastropoda) from the Meteor seamount group, central North Atlantic. Iberus. 36(2): 149-155.

External links
 JEFFREYS J.G., 1883 On the Mollusca procured during the "Lightning" and "Porcupine" expeditions 1868–70. Part VI. Proc. zool. Soc. London, 1882 : 88-149
 Dall W.H. (1927). Small shells from dredgings off the southeast coast of the United states by the United States Fisheries Steamer "Albatross", in 1885 and 1886. i>Proceedings of the United States National Museum 70(2667): 1-134
 Rosenberg, G.; Moretzsohn, F.; García, E. F. (2009). Gastropoda (Mollusca) of the Gulf of Mexico, Pp. 579–699 in: Felder, D.L. and D.K. Camp (eds.), Gulf of Mexico–Origins, Waters, and Biota. Texas A&M Press, College Station, Texas
  Serge GOFAS, Ángel A. LUQUE, Joan Daniel OLIVER,José TEMPLADO & Alberto SERRA (2021) - The Mollusca of Galicia Bank (NE Atlantic Ocean); European Journal of Taxonomy 785: 1–114

Haloceratidae
Gastropods described in 1883
Taxa named by John Gwyn Jeffreys